The 1975 Mississippi State Bulldogs football team represented Mississippi State University during the 1975 NCAA Division I football season. The Bulldogs finished 6–4–1 on the field. However, the NCAA later forced them to forfeit four of the wins and the tie due to having played an ineligible player.

Schedule

Roster

References

Mississippi State
Mississippi State Bulldogs football seasons
Mississippi State Bulldogs football